USS West Zula (ID-3501) was a United States Navy cargo ship in commission from 1918 to 1919.

Construction, acquisition, and commissioning 
West Zula was built as the commercial cargo ship SS West Zula by the Los Angeles Shipbuilding and Drydock Company at San Pedro, Los Angeles, for the United States Shipping Board. Launched on 4 July 1918, she was completed in September 1918, and the U.S. Navy acquired her from the Shipping Board on 26 September 1918. Assigned the naval registry identification number 3501, she was commissioned that day as USS West Zula (ID-3501) at San Pedro, California.

Operational history 
Assigned to the Naval Overseas Transportation Service, West Zula conducted sea trials and then departed for Chile. She loaded a cargo of guano at Arica, Chile, got underway on 22 November 1918, and proceeded via the Panama Canal toward New York City. After passing through the canal, however, she was re-routed to Jacksonville, Florida, where she unloaded her cargo of nitrates before steaming on to Philadelphia, Pennsylvania, for repairs which lasted until the end of January 1919.

Shifting to New York City on 31 January 1919, West Zula underwent further repairs there before she was decommissioned on 24 February 1919. She was returned to the Shipping Board that day and simultaneously stricken from the Navy List.

Once again SS West Zula, she was berthed in the Shipping Board's reserve fleet at Norfolk, Virginia. While she was laid up there, she deteriorated until she was abandoned in 1933.

References 

Department of the Navy: Naval Historical Center Online Library of Selected Images: Civilian Ships: S.S. West Zula (American Freighter, 1918). Served as USS West Zula (ID # 3501) in 1918–1919
NavSource Online: Section Patrol Craft Photo Archive: West Zula (ID 3501)

Design 1013 ships
Auxiliary ships of the United States Navy
World War I cargo ships of the United States
Ships built in Los Angeles
1918 ships